During the 2000–01 English football season, Aston Villa competed in the Premier League (known as the FA Carling Premiership for sponsorship reasons). Another season of decent (but rarely exciting) form saw Villa secure another top-10 finish, though this time they dipped slightly into eighth place after occupying sixth place a year earlier. Villa proved themselves as one of the hardest Premiership teams to beat, with only the top three sides suffering fewer defeats than Villa's 10, but a mere 13 wins and a staggering 15 draws ended any hopes of a title bid or even a top-six finish.

Juan Pablo Ángel signed Villa on 12 January 2001, becoming the club's record signing at £9.5 million. Angel made his debut away to Manchester United in a 0-2 loss on 20 January 2001.

Diary of Season
9 Sep 2000: In a league match against Ipswich Town, Luc Nilis was involved in a clash with goalkeeper Richard Wright that left him with a double compound fracture of his right shin ending his career. This was only Nilis's third match for Villa, having scored in both previous games.

Final league table

Results summary

Results by matchday

Results
Aston Villa's score comes first

Legend

FA Premier League

FA Cup

League Cup

Intertoto Cup

Players

First-team squad
Squad at end of season

Left club during season

Reserve squad

Under-19s
The following players spent most of the season playing for the under-19s, but may have also appeared for the reserves or under-17s.

Under-17s
The following players spent most of the season playing for the under-17s, but may have also appeared for the reserves or under-19s.

Other players
The following players were signed to the club on unknown contractual terms, and did not appear for any team this season.

Statistics

Starting 11
Considering starts in all competitions

Transfers

In

Out

Notes

References

External links
Aston Villa official website
avfchistory.co.uk 2000–01 season

Aston Villa F.C. seasons
Aston Villa